The Court Martial of Major Keller is a 1961 British film directed by Ernest Morris and written by Brian Clemens. It stars Laurence Payne, Susan Stephen and Austin Trevor. The film recounts the court martial for murder of Major Keller, a British army officer during the Second World War. He is charged with killing his superior officer, but remains silent, refusing to defend himself.

Cast
 Laurence Payne as Major Keller  
 Susan Stephen as Laura Winch  
 Ralph Michael as Colonel Winch  
 Richard Caldicot as Harrison  
 Basil Dignam as Morrell  
 Austin Trevor as Power  
 Simon Lack as Wilson  
 Jack McNaughton as Miller  
 Hugh Cross as Captain Cuby  
 Peter Sinclair as Sergeant  
 Humphrey Lestocq as Lieutenant Cameron

Critical reception
TV Guide gave the film two out of four stars, calling it an "occasionally interesting courtroom drama."

References

External links
 

1961 films
1961 drama films
British drama films
Military courtroom films
Films shot at New Elstree Studios
1960s English-language films
Films directed by Ernest Morris
1960s British films